Bishopmill Bridge is a road bridge in Elgin, Moray, Scotland.

History 
The first bridge at the site opened in 1814. In 1830, a replacement designed by William Robertson of Elgin was opened. Structural defects were found in the bridge which led to it being replaced again in 1871 with a new structure designed by John Willet.

In 1988 a new road bridge was constructed adjacent to the existing Bishopmill Bridge allowing the older bridge to be used exclusively for pedestrians and cyclists. This followed the completion of the A96 inner relief road in 1981 which the bridge is connected to.

As part of the Elgin flood alleviation scheme, the old Bishopmill bridge was replaced. The new footbridge, named Lossie Wynd Footbridge, was opened in 2015.

Design 
The old Bishopmill bridge, now removed, was Category B listed.

References 

Road bridges in Scotland
Pedestrian bridges in Scotland
Transport in Moray
Elgin, Moray
Bridges across the River Lossie